Nalca (Naltya, Naltje) is a Papuan language spoken in Yahukimo Regency, Highland Papua, Indonesia. Alternative names are Hmanggona, Hmonono, Kimnyal (Kimyal). The latter is most often used for Korupun-Sela. Indonesian Kemendikbud classified Nalca as Mek Nalca, while Kimyal is used for Korupun-Sela.

The Nalca language was an unwritten language until missionaries from the USA entered the area in the early 1960s.  A literacy program was developed, and many people in the Nalca language group learned to read.   Roger Doriot from the USA learned the language and completed the translation of the New Testament of the Bible in 2000.

References

Mek languages
Languages of western New Guinea